Wilbert Fernandez is a Venezuelan association footballer for Paraguayan Third Division club Cerro Porteño PF.

References

Living people
Year of birth missing (living people)
Venezuelan footballers
Place of birth missing (living people)

Association footballers not categorized by position